Thomas "Pieface" Kalmaku is a fictional character, a supporting character associated with Green Lantern in comic books published by DC Comics. He was created by writer John Broome and penciler Gil Kane.

Fictional character biography
Thomas Kalmaku was introduced in Green Lantern vol. 2, #2 (Oct. 1960) as a young Inuk mechanic at Ferris Aircraft, also the employer of test pilot Hal Jordan. In the Silver Age he was referred to as Pieface; however, this has not been used for some time. As one journalist described:

In his early appearances, Kalmaku had a girlfriend named Terga. They later married, but have since separated.

Kalmaku was one of the few people who knew Jordan's secret and kept a journal of Green Lantern's adventures, which he later published as a biography of Jordan. In several stories, as a non-costumed sidekick, he either assisted the hero or required rescuing.

During the Millennium crossover, Kalmaku is revealed to be one of the "Chosen" who forms the New Guardians. He has the superpower to bring out the best in people. He resides with the team for some time on a small island. When Guy Gardner appears on a boat to take over the team, Tom tries to calm the situation, as he and the team only wish to help Guy with his obvious anger problems. The situation degenerates and Guy is forcibly removed from the island by the power of Gloss. Later, Tom leaves the team to be with his family.

The graphic novel Legacy: The Last Will and Testament of Hal Jordan focuses on Kalmaku and his immense difficulty dealing with the aftermath of Jordan's rampage and killings. In it, he goes on a final mission on Jordan's behalf, eventually reconstructing the planet Oa and the Great Battery and mending his relationship with his son, daughter, and wife.

It is later revealed that he is about to become an equal partner in Carol Ferris's aircraft company. It is also mentioned that the Guardians of the Universe once offered Kalmaku a power ring, but that he turned it down, with a simple "Naw". It had originally been revealed in Legacy that Kalmaku was Jordan's choice to be his replacement.

Kalmaku was briefly featured in the Green Lantern: Secret Origin storyline, which reworked some of the earlier parts of the Green Lantern mythos. In this new origin, Kalmaku greatly disliked being called "Pieface" by an arrogant pilot, and was defended by Jordan, who had just joined Ferris Aircraft.

Other versions

DC: The New Frontier
Tom makes a brief appearance in Darwyn Cooke's DC: The New Frontier miniseries (2003–2004), which is an alternate-universe story set in the 1950s. Here, Thomas angrily objects to the name Pieface when Hal Jordan first uses it, but quickly forgives him when he realizes there was no ill intent (Jordan had just overheard other pilots using the nickname).

Flashpoint
In the alternate timeline of the Flashpoint event, Thomas Kalmaku is still Hal Jordan's aide. While inspecting an alien Abin Sur's survivor crashed aircraft, Tom and Hector Hammond are studying the spaceship technology as a stealth aircraft. After Hal's death, Tom gives Carol Ferris a gift from Hal saying that he always loved her.

In other media

Television
 A similar character called Kairo appeared in The Superman/Aquaman Hour of Adventure voiced by Paul Frees.  Like Tom, Kairo knew Green Lantern's secret identity and like Tom, Kairo was a mechanic.
 Tom Kalmaku appears in the Young Justice episode "Depths" voiced by Kevin Michael Richardson.

Film
 Taika Waititi portrays Tom Kalmaku in the live-action film, Green Lantern. Tom is an aerospace engineer working at Ferris Aircraft, in addition to being Hal Jordan's best friend and the first person Hal turns to after he receives his power ring.
 Tom Kalmaku makes a brief cameo appearance in Justice League: The New Frontier.

References

DC Comics scientists
DC Comics sidekicks
Fictional characters from Alaska
Comics characters introduced in 1960
Fictional mechanics
Fictional aerospace engineers
Fictional business executives
Characters created by John Broome
Characters created by Gil Kane
Green Lantern characters
DC Comics male characters
DC Comics film characters